
Year 234 (CCXXXIV) was a common year starting on Wednesday (link will display the full calendar) of the Julian calendar. At the time, it was known as the Year of the Consulship of Pupienus and Sulla (or, less frequently, year 987 Ab urbe condita). The denomination 234 for this year has been used since the early medieval period, when the Anno Domini calendar era became the prevalent method in Europe for naming years.

Events 
<onlyinclude>

By place

Roman Empire 
 Emperor Alexander Severus and his mother Julia Mamaea move to Moguntiacum (modern Mainz), the capital of Germania Superior. His generals have planned a military offensive and built a bridge across the Rhine. Alexander prefers to negotiate for peace by buying off the Alemanni. This policy outrages the Roman legions and he loses the trust of the troops.

China 
 Battle of Wuzhang Plains between the Chinese states of Shu Han and Cao Wei: The army of Shu Han retreats, following an inconclusive result.

Korea 
 Saban becomes king of the Korean kingdom of Baekje. He is succeeded by Goi of Baekje later in the same year.

Births 
 Porphyry, Phoenician Neoplatonic philosopher (d. c. 305)
 Wang Rong, Chinese general and politician (d. 305)

Deaths 
 April 21 – Xian of Han, Chinese emperor of the Han Dynasty (b. 181)
 Li Miao (or Hannan), Chinese official and politician
 Li Yan (or Li Ping), Chinese general and politician
 Liu Yan (or Weishuo), Chinese general and politician
 Liu Ye (or Ziyang), Chinese court adviser and politician
 Pan Zhang (or Wengui), Chinese general and politician
 Sun Huan (or Jiming), Chinese nobleman and general
 Wei Yan (or Wenchang), Chinese general and politician
 Xiahou Hui (or Yuanrong), Chinese noblewoman (b. 211)
 Zhuge Liang, Chinese statesman and strategist (b. 181)

References